Rom 5:12 is the tenth studio album by Swedish black metal band Marduk. It was recorded and mixed between December 2006 and January 2007 and released on April 24, 2007 by Regain Records. The CD version of the album includes a 44-page booklet, and the LP and picture disc pressings were limited to 500 copies each. Rom 5:12 is the last Marduk album to feature Emil Dragutinovic. Just as the previous album Plague Angel, it features a second collaboration with the Martial Industrial band Arditi.

Track listing

Credits

Marduk
 Mortuus (Daniel Rostén) – vocals; artwork, songwriting (2 & 7)
 Evil (Morgan Steinmeyer Håkansson) – guitar
 Devo (Magnus Andersson) – bass

Additional personnel

Drums
 Emil Dragutinovic – (1, 2, 4, 6, 8 & 10)
 A. Gustafsson (Jens Gustafsson) – (3, 7 & 9)

Guest Vocals
 Joakim Göthberg – "Cold Mouth Prayer"
 Naihmass Nemtheanga – "Accuser/Opposer"

Additional Performance on "1651"
Arditi

Charts

References

2007 albums
Marduk (band) albums
Regain Records albums